"Space Invaders" is a song by Croatian-Danish bubblegum dance group Hit'n'Hide, released in 1998 on Scandinavian Records as the third single and as well as the third track from their debut studio album, On a Ride (1998). It was written by Jens Ringdal and Sune Munkholm Pedersen, and produced by Michael Skouboe. The song was successful in Scandinavia, peaking at number one in Denmark and number four in Norway. A music video was also produced to promote the single.

Track listing

Charts

References

External links
 
 
 
 
 

1998 singles
1998 songs
Hit'n'Hide songs
Number-one singles in Denmark